Chiquititas, also known as Chiquititas Remake, is a 2013–2015 Brazilian soap opera written by Íris Abravanel, originally aired on SBT. Based on the original series of same name created by Cris Morena, it is also a remake of the previous version for that country. The soap opera is directed by Reynaldo Boury, with Ricardo Mantoanelli directing the music videos.

The remake was announced in September 2012 by SBT, with the purpose of maintaining the positive ratings given by Carrossel, also directed for younger viewers. Chiquititas was supposed to follow the traditional soap opera format, but as it gained very good ratings, it prompted the network to renew the series for two more seasons, delaying its ending for 2015.

Chiquititas stars Brazilian actress Manuela do Monte as Carol, a young woman who gradually assumes the role of a mother for a group of orphans living in a manor, the Raio de Luz orphanage, and Isabela Palhano Ana Paula, an orphan who seeks to know about her unknown origins.

Plot
Soon after Gabriela (Naiumi Goldoni) had a child, her father, José Ricardo Almeida Campos (Roberto Frota) kidnapped his granddaughter because, as a very conservative man, he could not accept the idea that his daughter became involved with a servant. As his granddaughter Ana Paula (Isabela Palhano) needs a place to live, he starts an orphanage named "Raio De Luz" ("Light Gleam", originally "Rincón de Luz", which means "Corner of Light").Ana Paula grew up in this Manor, alongside other girls that later arrived. Her fellows are Bia, Ana, sisters Tati and Vivi, and Cris. As the years passed, the girls became a family.

They are supervised by Ernestina, the rigorous and funny janitor of the orphanage, and Chico, the adorable Chef very beloved by the girls. Sofia is the director of the orphanage until Carmem (Giovanna Gold), an ambitious woman who is also the sister of José Ricardo, takes her off this position. Their family is later increased with the arrival of Pata, Mosca, Binho and Rafa, children who lived in the streets before being upheld by the institution. Pata and Ana Paula became best friends, while Binho, Mosca and Rafa are the first boys to be introduced in the manor. The homeless children are taken to the house by a sweethearted young woman who touches and changes their lives, as well as the lives of the girls inside Raio De Luz.

The woman is Carolina (Manuela do Monte), or Carol, a young woman that works in one of the Almeida's cafeterias and is also a psychology academic. Carol lives with her friend Clarita (Letícia Navas) and her brother Beto (Emílio Eric Surita). They take care of Dani (Carolina Chamberlain), a girl that has recently lost her mother Letícia (Amanda Acosta). At her work, Carol meets Junior (Guilherme Boury), Ricardo's youngest son, an economist who lived in London and is back to São Paulo to continue his business. He discovers his emotionally unstable sister Gabriela, and blames his father for her condition. Junior also brings José Ricardo's supposed benevolence into question, since he always demonstrated snobbery and egoism. Alongside Carol, Junior helps Ana Paula in the search for her past.

Carol and Junior fall in love with each other, but José Ricardo, with his snobbish behaviour, does the impossible to keep them apart. His daughter, Gabriela, became mentally affected since she believes she had a stillborn child, actually a lie her father had told her right after Ana Paula was born. Her serious condition is softened by Ana Paula herself, both unaware of their blood ties.

Production
Differently from the previous Brazilian version, Chiquititas is completely produced in Brazil. Also, the cast members sing the musical themes by themselves, instead of dubbing the songs, as done in Chiquititas Brasil. Vocal skills were required during the auditions.

Actress Manuela do Monte portrays Carol. Monte stated that she did not watch the previous Brazilian version of the story, rather being 
inspired by real-life experiences in an orphanage she has frequented. Despite not watching Chiquititas Brasil, the actress stated that she did express interest in auditioning for a role at its time, but ended up not doing it. The part was played by actress Flávia Monteiro in Chiquititas Brasil, and by Romina Yan in Chiquititas (as Belén Fraga).

Isabela Palhano portrays Ana Paula the oldest orphan among the chiquititas. Isabela declared that she is doing her own version for the character, although praising its portrayal previously done by Fernanda Souza, which catapulted Souza's career. Ana Paula was originally played by Argentine actress Agustina Cherri. Isabela auditioned seven times until definitely getting the role.

Actor Gésio Amadeu, who portrayed Chico the Chef in Chiquititas Brasil, was asked by SBT to reprise his role, which he could not accept due to commitments with Rede Globo's telenovela Flor do Caribe. Fellow actor João Acaiabe was then suggested by Amadeu for the part. The character was originally portrayed by actor Alberto Fernández de Rosa (named Saverio the Chef), who was also a supervising producer of Chiquititas Brasil.

The series is directed by Reynaldo Boury, produced by Fernando Pelegio, and written by author Íris Abravanel, all of them responsible for the creation of Carrossel. Chiquititas is unique for having no involvement of creator Cris Morena.

Reaction of the Brazilian original cast
Actress Flávia Monteiro, who portrayed Carol in the previous version, has supported the remake by saying "I'm pretty sure that it'll be a huge hit. I hope they maintain that magic and sensibility (...). It's essential not to lose all that ludic and joy that existed". Fernanda Souza also demonstrated positive thoughts on the 2013 series, stating that Chiquititas is a beautiful work which children and teenagers are in need. Its innocence is missing". About the portrayal of Ana Paula, she declared, "She was a very special role to me, and I'm sure she's going to change her [Isabela Palhano's] life as well".

Actor and humorist Nelson Freitas, who played the role of Doctor Fernando Brausen, opined, "The remake might achieve a good result, but that strong originality might be hard to supplant.

Reception
The remake has fulfilled SBT's expectations, obtaining positive ratings at its premiere. Íris Abravanel's writing was also well received, particularly for her creative liberty in relation to both Chiquititas and Chiquititas Brasils storylines. The series was supposed to end in 2014, but the good ratings forced SBT to increase the story, delaying the end of Chiquititas for 2015.

Manuela do Monte's portrayal of Carol, received initial criticism from fans and reviewers, who noticed a "lack of life" in her acting. However, a columnist emphasized that Monte is providing a completely new portrayal on the character, which diverges from the one made by Flávia Monteiro in Chiquititas Brasil.

Beyond the released soundtrack, the series spawned more than thirty different licensed products such as figurines and clothing.

Cast 

Children

Soundtrack

Track listing

 Remexe (Rechufas) - Chiquititas opening theme
 Todo Mundo Chique
 Berlinda (A Berlín)
 Sinais (Señales)
 Te Gosto Tanto 
 Palco 
 O Chefe Chico (El Chef Saverio)
 Mentirinhas (Mentiritas)
 Quero Te Encontrar 
 Tudo, Tudo (Todo Todo)
 Grava Essa Ideia
 Amigas
 Até Dez (Hasta Diez)
 Abraça O Mundo
 Igual Aos Demais (Igual A Los Demás)
 Da Água Pro Vinho
 Sempre Juntos
In addition to the original songs composed by Carlos Nilson and Cris Morena, the soundtrack features eight new themes, them being MPB cover versions and original themes composed and produced by Arnaldo Saccomani and Laércio Ferreira, respectively. The songs "Abraça o Mundo", "Amigas", "Sempre Juntos" and "Todo Mundo Chique" are original themes. "Grava Essa Ideia" and "Palco" are covers from Grupo D+ and the MPB singer Gilberto Gil. A version of Claudinho & Buchecha's 1997 single "Quero Te Encontrar" is also featured.

References

External links
 Chiquititas at the Internet Movie Database
 Official website 

2013 telenovelas
2013 Brazilian television series debuts
2015 Brazilian television series endings
Brazilian telenovelas
Sistema Brasileiro de Televisão telenovelas
Musical telenovelas
Children's telenovelas
Comedy telenovelas
Sentient toys in fiction
Brazilian television series based on Argentine television series
Portuguese-language telenovelas
Television series about orphans